Woodside is a residential area of Telford, Shropshire, England.

In 1963, Dawley New Town (soon to be known as Telford) was designated in the area surrounding towns and villages such as Ironbridge, Dawley and Wellington, to ease the housing problem in the West Midlands conurbation some 20 miles away. The intention was to bring jobs to the area as well as houses to accommodate the thousands of workers being attracted to the town.

For the less well-off inhabitants of the new town, there needed to be council housing available. The Woodside estate was among the council housing projects first planned in the development of Telford new town. It was developed in the late 1960s and early 1970s, and is among the largest housing estates in Shropshire.

In 2005, students from The Abraham Darby Specialist School for the Performing Arts (Now known as Haberdashers' Abraham Darby) performed a new piece of theatre called Starting Again written by a local writer, which told the history of the local area over the last 40 years.

History
Woodside came to fruition due to the New Towns Act of 1946, which saw Dawley New Town, now known as Telford New Town, named after the famous Scottish civil engineer, Thomas Telford being developed to cope mainly with the overspill from the West Midlands conurbation.

The land that was chosen for Woodside was previously used for farming and mining purposes, namely Rough Park Farm and Leasowes Farm. Brick Kiln Leasowes Crawstone Pit still part exists today in the form of its spoil mound running along both Ironbridge Road and the William Reynolds School. It was here in 1864 that nine men (the youngest being just a child of 12 years) fell to a tragic death, when a rope lowered to haul the men out,  at the end of a busy day, snapped and all lives were lost in the fall. Within the woodland which now covers the spoil mound, the brick pond can still be seen from which water was drawn from the mine.

Situated in south Telford, Woodside was originally built as a council housing estate, being managed by both Telford Development Corporation and Dawley District Council. Modern housing was provided along with shopping and play areas as well as community facilities including a health centre, schools, public houses, a police station and a community centre.

Other facilities were provided at the nearby district of Madeley, which included a leisure centre, shops, a library and banks.
Educational facilities were provided with two county primary schools along with a playschool. Secondary education was provided nearby at Madeley, namely the Abraham Darby and Madeley Court Schools. Roman Catholic education facilities were at St Marys’ Primary, Madeley and Blessed Robert Johnson secondary at Wellington.

Employment was a main factor of people re-locating to Woodside, with plentiful employment being made available at the newly built Tweedale and Halesfield industrial estates nearby.

Public transport was provided by the Midland Red bus company. They offered residents local services to other areas of the new town, along with direct services to out of town places such as Shrewsbury, Bridgnorth, Wolverhampton and Birmingham.

Woodside was unique in the way it was built and also the residents in which it had attracted.
The estate was built using the Radburn design, thus separating the motor car from the footpaths. This gave a friendlier feel to the estate and helped people move about more freely, both enjoying the freedom of the landscaped areas throughout and shopping without the worry of the car.

It was not just the West Midlands in which the residents had left behind people came far and wide from all over England, Scotland, Wales and Ireland along with a handful from even more distant shores. Each resident had a skill, trade or profession which they could offer to help with the development of the estate and the new town.

K.McLean 05/2014

Deprivation, regeneration
Woodside is the most deprived part of Telford. The 2001 Census revealed that 37.2% of the area's households did not have access to a car, 18.0% of households were single parent families, unemployment was at 11.3%. However, this was significantly less than the 1991 total of 17.3%, as the economy had been in recession then and was in a much healthier position 10 years later. With the recession that affected Britain from mid-2008, however, it is anticipated that the 2011 Census will show a considerably higher level of unemployment.

Major regeneration of the estate has taken place in recent years, the most notable phase being the demolition of 350 deck-access flats and maisonettes to make way for a 191-home development by Bellway Homes. Almost all of the remaining houses on the estate have been brought up to modern standards.

The area has a high crime rate compared to the national average and has large amounts of anti-social behaviour. The police are aware of the issue.

Sources

Telford
Radburn design housing estates